Founded in 1926, the Business Technology Association (BTA) serves office technology dealerships, resellers, manufacturers, distributors and service companies. Its core members — office technology dealerships — consult, provide services and sell hardware, software and supplies with the goal of helping businesses maximize their investment in devices and technology. The association offers its members various educational programs, information, research, legal services, publications and guidance. BTA is based in Kansas City, Missouri, United States.

BTA publishes Office Technology magazine and the BTA Hotline e-newsletter, provides benchmarking studies, reports and educational offerings.

See also
Trade association
Typewriter
Photocopier
Multi-function printer

External links
Official site

Technology trade associations
Organizations based in Kansas City, Missouri